Laricheh (also Romanized as Lārīcheh; also known as Lārcheh) is a village in Musaabad Rural District, in the Central District of Dehaqan County, Isfahan Province, Iran. At the 2006 census, its population was 286, in 85 families.

References 

Populated places in Dehaqan County